The Islamabad United is a franchise cricket team that competed  in the 2018 Season. The team represents Islamabad in the Pakistan Super League (PSL). The team was coached by Dean Jones, and captained by Misbah-ul-Haq. In the final, they beat Peshawar Zalmi by 3 wickets to win their second PSL title.

Teams standings

Points table

Playoffs

Preliminary

Qualifier 1

Final

References

External links 
 Team Records in 2018 at ESPNcricinfo

2018 Pakistan Super League
United in 2018
2018